Altes Theater may refer to:

 Altes Theater (Leipzig)
 Altes Theater (Düsseldorf)
 Altes Theater (Heilbronn)